Francisco Murta, mostly known for his stage name, Murta (born 31 August 1998) is a Portuguese singer-songwriter. He was the runner-up of the season 4 of The Voice Portugal in 2016.

Career 
In 2016, he participated on the fourth edition on The Voice Portugal. He chose Aurea as a mentor on the blind auditions where he sang "Georgia on My Mind". He eventually lost in the final to Fernando Daniel by public vote, granting a second place position.

On 7 August 2019 he performed at the LG Stage of Meo Sudoeste.

Discography

Albums

Singles

As featured artist

Trivia 
 The physical edition of the D'Art Vida album has a leaf with yellow daisy seeds for those who buy the album to plant them.

References 

1998 births
Living people
21st-century Portuguese male singers
The Voice of Portugal contestants
People from Figueira da Foz